Les Belshaw (birth registered fourth ¼ 1927 – 11 February 2016) was an English sports writer, rugby photographer, and professional rugby league footballer who played in the 1950s and 1960s, and coached in the 1960s.

Playing career
Les Belshaw's birth was registered in Doncaster, West Riding of Yorkshire, England, he died aged 88 at the Methodist Homes for the Aged Warde Aldam Care Home in South Elmsall, West Yorkshire, and his funeral took place at Rose Hill Cemetery, Ascot Avenue, Cantley, Doncaster, DN4 6HE at 1.30pm on Friday 11 March 2016.

Challenge Cup Final appearances
Les Belshaw played left-, i.e. number 8, in Barrow's 21-12 victory over Workington Town in the 1954–55 Challenge Cup Final during the 1954–55 season at Wembley Stadium, London on Saturday 30 April 1955, in front of a crowd of 66,513.

County Cup Final appearances
Les Belshaw played left-, i.e. number 8, in Barrow's 12-2 victory over Oldham in the 1954 Lancashire County Cup Final during the 1954–55 season at Station Road, Swinton on Saturday 23 October 1954.

Genealogical information
Les Belshaw's marriage to Dorothy M. (née Thompson) was registered during second ¼ 1950 in Doncaster district. They had children; Doctor Christopher "Chris" D. Belshaw (birth registered during first ¼  in Doncaster district), a senior lecturer in philosophy at the Open University, and Michael "Mike" J. Belshaw (birth registered during second ¼  in Don Valley district) a lecturer in art at Doncaster College .

References

External links
"Belshaw" at rugbyleagueproject.org
Former Doncaster rugby star turned sports writer dies 
The History Of Barrow Raiders
Barrow RL Challenge Cup winner Les Belshaw dies

1927 births
2016 deaths
Barrow Raiders players
Bradford Bulls players
Doncaster R.L.F.C. coaches
Doncaster R.L.F.C. players
English rugby league coaches
English rugby league players
Rugby league players from Doncaster
Rugby league props